The following is an outline of topics related to the British Overseas Territory of the Virgin Islands.

British Virgin Islands
 British Virgin Islands
 British Virgin Islands Bar Association
 British Virgin Islands Financial Services Commission
 British Virgin Islands at the 2006 Commonwealth Games
 Coat of arms of the British Virgin Islands
 Colonial Heads of the British Virgin Islands
 Cyril Romney
 Dead Man's Chest Island
 Demographics of the British Virgin Islands
 Districts of the British Virgin Islands
 Flag of the British Virgin Islands
 Geography of the British Virgin Islands
 HMS Astraea
 HMS Nymph
 Heads of government of the British Virgin Islands
ISO 3166-1 alpha-2 country code for the British Virgin Islands: VG
ISO 3166-1 alpha-3 country code for the British Virgin Islands: VGB
 Islands of British Virgin Islands
 Lavity Stoutt
 List of BVIslanders
 List of presidents of the British Virgin Islands
 Military of the British Virgin Islands
 Music of the Virgin Islands
 Necker Island (British Virgin Islands)
 Norman Island
 Orlando Smith
 Peter Island
 Queen Elizabeth II Bridge, British Virgin Islands
 RMS Rhone
 Road Town
 Roman Catholic Diocese of St. John's - Bassetere
 Salt Island, British Virgin Islands
 The Scout Association of the British Virgin Islands
 St Phillip's Church, Tortola
 Virgin Islands Creole
 Willard Wheatley
 Area code 284

Buildings and structures in the British Virgin Islands

Airports in the British Virgin Islands
 Auguste George Airport
 Terrance B. Lettsome International Airport
 Virgin Gorda Airport

Historical buildings in the British Virgin Islands
 Copper Mine, Virgin Gorda
 Fort Burt
 Fort Charlotte, Tortola
 Fort George, Tortola
 Fort Purcell
 Fort Recovery
 Road Town Fort
 St Phillip's Church, Tortola

Communications in the British Virgin Islands
 Communications on the British Virgin Islands
 Area code 284
.vg Internet country code top-level domain for the British Virgin Islands

Television stations in the British Virgin Islands
 Template:UKVI TV
 ZBTV
 VITV

Economy of the British Virgin Islands
 Economy of the British Virgin Islands

History of the British Virgin Islands
 Arthur William Hodge
 History of the British Virgin Islands
 Jost Van Dyke
 Long Look Estate
 St Phillip's Church, Tortola

Elections in the British Virgin Islands
 Elections in the British Virgin Islands

People of the British Virgin Islands
 Dion Crabbe
 Ralph T. O'Neal
 Dancia Penn
 Michael Riegels
 Cyril Romney
 Orlando Smith
 Lavity Stoutt
 William Thornton
 Willard Wheatley

Politicians of the British Virgin Islands
 Governor of the British Virgin Islands
 Heads of government of the British Virgin Islands
 List of presidents of the British Virgin Islands
 Tom Macan
 Ralph T. O'Neal
 David Pearey
 Cyril Romney
 Orlando Smith
 Lavity Stoutt
 Willard Wheatley

British Virgin Islands athletes
 Dion Crabbe
 Tahesia Harrigan
 Kyron McMaster

Politics of the British Virgin Islands
 Governor of the British Virgin Islands
 House of Assembly of the British Virgin Islands
 Cabinet of the British Virgin Islands
 Politics of the British Virgin Islands
 List of elected politicians in the British Virgin Islands

Political parties in the British Virgin Islands
 List of political parties in the British Virgin Islands
 National Democratic Party (British Virgin Islands)
 United Party (British Virgin Islands)
 Virgin Islands Party
 VI Democratic Party

Sport in the British Virgin Islands
 British Virgin Islands at the 2006 Commonwealth Games
 Leeward Islands cricket team

Football in the British Virgin Islands
 British Virgin Islands Football Association
 British Virgin Islands national football team

Football venues in the British Virgin Islands
 Sherly Ground

British Virgin Islands at the Olympics
 British Virgin Islands at the 2000 Summer Olympics
 British Virgin Islands at the 2004 Summer Olympics

Transport in the British Virgin Islands
 Transport in the British Virgin Islands

See also

List of British Virgin Islands–related topics
List of Caribbean-related topics
List of international rankings
Lists of country-related topics
Outline of geography
Outline of North America

External links

 Related Topics